Gorniès is a commune in the Hérault département in the Occitanie region in southern France. The river Vis flows through the commune.

Population

Sights
Arboretum du Grenouillet

See also
Communes of the Hérault department

References

Communes of Hérault